Matthew Nudds is a British philosopher and Professor of Philosophy at the University of Warwick where he is also Chair of the Faculty of Social Sciences. He is known for his works on philosophy of mind and philosophy of perception.

Books
Rational Animals, edited with S. Hurley, Oxford University Press, 2009
Sounds and perception: new philosophical essays, edited with C. O’Callaghan. Oxford University Press, 2009

References

External links
Matthew Nudds at the University of Warwick

British philosophers
Philosophy academics
Living people
Academics of the University of Warwick
Year of birth missing (living people)
Philosophers of mind
Alumni of University College London
Academics of the University of Edinburgh